LSR may refer to:

Computing
 Label switch router, a type of router located in the middle of an MPLS network
 Lego Stunt Rally, a video game
 Link-state routing protocol, one of the two main classes of routing protocols used in packet switching networks
 Linux Screen Reader, a free and open source assistive technology of the GNOME desktop environment
 Logical shift right, a type of logical shift operator used in some computer languages
 Loose Source Routing, an IP routing option used for mobility in IP networks
 Link state request, a type of OSPF protocol message

Organizations
 LSR Group, one of Russia's largest construction firms
 Lady Shri Ram College for Women, a university in Delhi, India
 League for Socialist Reconstruction, a DeLeonist political organization in the United States
 League for Social Reconstruction, a socialist think-tank in Canada which ran from 1931 to 1942
 Leeds Student Radio, a student radio station based in Leeds
 Liberdade, Socialismo e Revolução,  a Brazilian socialist organization
 Life Sciences Research, the U.S. incorporation of Huntingdon Life Sciences
 LifeRing Secular Recovery, an addiction recovery support group

Sciences
 Local standard of rest, a frame of reference for motion of matter in the Milky Way galaxy proximate to the Sun
 Land speed record, the record for highest speed by a land vehicle
 Liquid silicone rubber, a form of silicone rubber
 Lipolysis-stimulated lipoprotein receptor

Other
 LSR (sniper rifle), a Pakistani sniper rifle
 Local storm report, a product issued by the U.S. National Weather Service
 A type of equipment on the Israel television show HaShminiya